Maza Agadbam is a 2018 Indian Marathi-language comedy drama film directed by Trupti Bhoir and produced by Pen Studios. It is an sequel of 2010 film Agadbam. The film was theatrically released on 26 October 2018.

Plot 
Nazuka wants to fulfill her fathers dream by defeating wrestlers all over the world and make name for herself and her state Maharashtra.

Cast 

 Subodh Bhave as Rayba
 Trupti Bhoir as Najuka
 Usha Nadkarni as Rayba's Mother 
 Tanaji Galgunde as Vajne
 Jaywant Wadkar Najuka's Father 
 Mike Wietecha as Yamaha

Release 
Maza Agadbam was theatrically released on 26 October 2018.

Soundtrack 

Music is given by T Satish Chakravarthy.

Reception

References

External links 

  
 Maza Agadbam at Rotten Tomatoes

2018 films
Indian comedy films